Château Clarke is a wine property of Bordeaux of  based in the Listrac-Médoc AOC and classified as Cru Bourgeois.

History
In the 12th century, the Cistercian monks of the Vertheuil Abbey established the first grapevine. The estate would permanently bear Tobie Clarke's name in 1818, when the knight Clarke purchased the land. Baron Edmond de Rothschild became the landowner in 1973.
Following the change of ownership the neglected vineyard was re-planned, and then completely recreated between 1974 and 1978, to attain a final wine-producing area of 54 hectares. Today, the vines are planted on clay–limestone hilltops, the optimum soil and environment for the Merlot grape.

Following the death of Edmond de Rothschild the estate was inherited by his son, Benjamin de Rothschild and Ariane de Rothschild. Edmond chose Château Clarke as his last resting place and is buried in the grounds of the chateau.

Soil
The vineyard is made up of Cabernet Sauvignon (48%), Merlot (42%), Cabernet Franc (8%), and Petit Verdot (2%), planted on a limestone ground calcareous eocene and calcareous clay (spacing: 6060 vines/ha). It is a traditional vine training, and the pruning is in Double Guyot. The entire surface area was drained prior to planting and again when the vines had matured between 1987 and 1989. The plantations began in 1974 and were completed in 1978.

Wine
The maturation takes 12 to 18 months, and the fining is done with egg white. The production is about of 150,000 to 250,000 bottles per year.

References

External links
Rothschild wine activities
Compagnie vinicole Edmond de Rothschild

Bordeaux wine producers
Rothschild family residences